Founded in 2007, the Pentawards is an annual packaging design competition and online hub for packaging designers. Participants include designers, freelancers, design agencies, communication & advertising agencies, brands, packaging manufacturers and students.

History

The Pentawards was created by Jean Jacques Evrard and Brigitte Evrard-Lauwereins, founders and directors of a design agency which joined Carré Noir from 1994 to 1998 and subsequently the Desgrippes Gobé group. At the end of 2006, they left their agency in order to run Pentawards full-time. In October 2016 the Pentawards was acquired by Easyfairs, moving its head office to London, UK.

The pentagon is the official symbol of Pentawards for five reasons. The pentagon is the shape of the historic city centre in Brussels - where the competition was founded, the pentagram is the ancient symbol of beauty, there are five fingers on the hand - an important design tool for humans, the Pentawards has five different award levels and humans have five main senses in which inspiration is taken from.

The purpose of Pentawards is to recognising excellence in design, providing a source of inspiration and connecting the global packaging community through the annual competition, international conferences, digital events, and more.

Registration and voting
Candidates must register on the Pentawards website and submit their creations, providing standardized visuals and in-depth descriptions of the packs. The submissions are grouped into categories and presented to the members of the Jury. The jury's vote takes place without the identity of the participants being revealed. The judging is based on four criteria: quality of design, brand expression, creativity & innovations and emotional connection. In each category, the five packaging designs receiving the overall highest scores are shortlisted. Shortlisted entrants are then asked to provide a physical sample of their packaging (except for concepts). Upon seeing the packaging, the Jury validates and confirms the nomination and prize level obtained: bronze, silver, gold, platinum or diamond.

Jury
The Jury currently includes over 50 international members, including designers or design agency directors and packaging design officials from 16 brands and 24 design agencies like Amazon, General Mills, P&G, Pearlfisher, Superunion, and Nestle. The president of the jury is Clem Halpin, Design Lead at Taxi Studio. The judging process takes into account international sensitivities, cultures and markets, including a diverse mix of nationalities, ages, genders, educations, skill sets and experiences. Their mandate runs for a maximum of four consecutive years and approximately one third of the jury is renewed every year.

Awards
Five levels of awards are given: diamond, platinum, gold, silver, bronze. The diamond award is given to the packaging design which, across all categories, received the highest number of points.  The platinum award goes in each of five major categories, to the packaging designs which received the most points in the given category. The gold, silver and bronze awards are given to the best packaging design in each sub-category. The trophies are representations of the Pentawards logo, a circle with a hollow pentagon in the center. They are manufactured with a zinc alloy and after being polished are plated. The "diamond" is a Swarovski crystal. The trophy was designed and engraved by Belgo-American artist Christian Heckscher.

Awards ceremony
Each year the Pentawards Gala Ceremony is held in a different location around the world. The event invites all of the winners to celebrate their achievements and receive their prize on stage in front of the global packaging design community. 

 2016: (Shanghai)
 2017: (Barcelona)
 2018: (New York)
 2019: (London)
 2020: The 2020 Gala Ceremony was held online as part of the Pentawards Festival 
 2021: The 2021 Gala Ceremony was held online.

Diamond Pentaward winners
 2007: Swinckels beer – Design Bridge agency (Netherlands) – Grimaldi Forum (Monaco)
 2008: Piper-Heidsieck Upside Down – BETC design agency / Viktor & Rolf (France/Netherlands) – Grimaldi Forum (Monaco)
 2009: Kleenex slice of summer – Kimberly-Clark|Kimberley-Clark]]) (USA) – Flagey (Brussels)
 2010: Hoyu3210 – ADK agency (company) (Japan) – Shanghai – Expo 2010
 2011: Ramlösa – Nine agency (Sweden)–New York Marriott Marquis (Times Square)
 2012: Coca-Cola Diet Coke – Turner Duckworth agency (USA)- Paris continental Le Grand (Opéra Garnier)
 2013: Absolut Vodka Absolut Unique – Family Business agency (Sweden) – W Hotel Barcelona
 2014: Evian The Drop – Danone Group and Grand Angle Design (France) – Palace Hotel Tokyo
 2015: Beauty Line Marc Jacobs – design by Established NYC (US) – RIBA, Unusual venues in central London, London's West End and Liverpool with RIBA Venues – London
 2016: Domino's – Jones Knowles Richie Graphic Design Studio – London 
 2017: Starck Paris – Perfumes y Diseño by Philippe Starck – Madrid (Spain)
 2018: Mutti passata – Auge Design for Mutti spa – Firenze (Italy)
 2019: Xbox Adaptive Controller – Microsoft – US
 2020: Air Vodka – Air Company – US
 2021: Eminente Reserva – Moët Hennessy – France

Special Pentawards 
The organizers have also awarded honorary prizes to individuals, organizations or brands.

Publications
Every two years, the winning entries appear in a reference book published by Taschen and available in French, English, German, Spanish and Portuguese.
 2010: The Package Design Book n°1
 2012: The Package Design Book n°2 
 2014: The Package Design Book n°3 
 2016: The Package Design Book n°4 
 2018: The Package Design Book n°5 
 2020: The Package Design Book n°6

Events
Besides its annual competition, Pentawards regularly holds events such as international conferences, panel discussions and design brunch events. On top of this, winner packages are showcased in different countries through Winners’ Exhibits and partners events. 

 September 2020: The Pentawards Festival, featuring two days of talks from industry experts and also a live Pentawards Gala Ceremony to announce 2020 competition winners. Including experts from Amazon, Xiaomi and more. 
 March 2021: The Pentawards Festival: Spring Edition, featuring six design experts from names like The Lego Group, Carrefour, Moët Hennessy and more.
 March 2021: UPM Raflatac sponsor webinar "The Future of Packaging Design" 
 May 2021: O-I Glass sponsor webinar "Rethinking Spirits Packaging: Sustainable Premium"

External links
 Official website
 Winners' Archive

References

Award ceremonies